Minuscule 826 (in the Gregory-Aland numbering of New Testament manuscripts), ε218 (in the von Soden numbering of New Testament manuscripts), is a 12th-century Greek minuscule manuscript of the New Testament on parchment. It has marginalia.

Description 
The manuscript is a codex (precursor to the modern book), containing the text of the four Gospels, on 233 parchment leaves (sized ). The text is written in two columns per page, 25–26 lines per page.

The Ammonian Sections are given with a references to the Eusebian Canons (written under Ammonian Sections).

According to biblical scholar and textual critic Frederick Henry Ambrose Scrivener, it is a beautiful codex.

Text 
The Greek text of the codex has been considered as a representative of the Caesarean text-type. The text-types are groups of different New Testament manuscripts which share specific or generally related readings, which then differ from each other group, and thus the conflicting readings can separate out the groups. These are then used to determine the original text as published; there are three main groups with names: Alexandrian, Western, and Byzantine. The Caesarean text-type however (initially identified by biblical scholar Burnett Hillman Streeter) has been contested by several text-critics, such as Kurt and Barbara Aland. Hermann von Soden classified it to the textual family I. According to Kurt and Barbara Aland, it supports the Byzantine text against the "original" 157 times, original against the Byzantine 27 times, and 77 times it agrees with both. It has also 60 independent or distinctive readings. Kurt Aland placed it in Category III of his New Testament manuscript classification system. Category III manuscripts are described as having "a small but not a negligible proportion of early readings, with a considerable encroachment of [Byzantine] readings, and significant readings from other sources as yet unidentified."

According to the Claremont Profile Method, it represents textual family ƒ (the Ferrar Family) in Luke 1, Luke 10, and Luke 20, as a perfect member of the family.

It lacks the text of Matthew 16:2b–3, but it was added by a later hand at the margin. It lacks the text of the Christ's agony at Gethsemane (Luke 22:43–44). The text of the Pericope Adulterae (John 7:53–8:11) is relocated and placed after Luke 21:38.

History 

Gregory dated the manuscript to the 12th century, whereas other palaeographers dated it to the 11th century. The manuscript is currently dated by the INTF to the 12th century. The manuscript was written in Calabria, in Rhegium.

The manuscript was examined and described by Antonio Rocci in 1882. William Henry Simcox collated a major part of Luke as per Gregory's request. It was examined by Kirsopp Lake and Jacob Geerlings. According to Geerlings it is the archetype of family 13 (the Ferrar Family).

It was added to the list of New Testament manuscripts by Scrivener (624) and Gregory (826). Gregory saw it in 1886.

The manuscript is currently housed at the Biblioteca della Badia (A' α. 3), in Grottaferrata.

See also 

 List of New Testament minuscules
 Biblical manuscript
 Textual criticism
 Minuscule 828

References

Further reading 

 
 Antonio Rocci, Codices cryptenses, seu Abbatiae Cryptae Ferratae in Tusculano digesti et illustrati (Tusculanum 1883). 
 Jacob Geerlings, Is Ms. 826 the archetype of Fam. 13a?, JBL 67 (1948), 357–363.
 Jacob Geerlings, Family 13 – The Ferrar Group: The Text According to Matthew, Studies and Documents 19, 1961.

External Links 

Images of Minuscule 826 (microfilm) at the CSNTM.

Greek New Testament minuscules
12th-century biblical manuscripts
Family 13